One Night Only is a sex comedy-romance film released on December 25, 2008, by OctoArts Films and Canary. The cast was made up of primarily ABS-CBN, GMA and TV5 actors and actresses.

Cast

Katrina Halili as Jasmine
Diana Zubiri as Vivian
Ricky Davao as	Congressman Facundo
Jayson Gainza as Barney
Joross Gamboa as Nestor
Maria Teresa Martinez as Lovely
Chokoleit as Edward
Bacci Garcia as Edward's assistant
Tessie Villarama as Inday
Manilyn Reynes
Jon Avila as Pons
Paolo Contis as Diego
Joey David	 as	Masahistang Larry
Alessandra de Rossi as	Angela
Lani Tapia	 as	Extrang Pearly
Valerie Concepcion as Vicky
Jennylyn Mercado as Elvie

Production and filming
One Night Only was shot on Marcos Highway in Antipolo during an August weekend. One of the lead actresses, Katrina Halili, was hired for the first time to work with writer-director Jose Javier Reyes. She signed the contract on July 22, 2008, to appear in this as well as in a remake of Miss X. On August 13, 2008, Diana Zubiri and Iya Villania joined the cast, replacing Roxanne Guinoo and Angelica Panganiban. That day, director Reyes wanted to replace Diether Ocampo, while still keeping Valerie Concepcion and Joross Gamboa. A month before its release, the film had already some controversy surrounding its cast.

Awards

References

External links

Philippine sex comedy films
Filipino-language films
2000s Tagalog-language films
OctoArts Films films
Films directed by José Javier Reyes